The 2017 New South Wales Cup season was the tenth season of the New South Wales Cup administered by the New South Wales Rugby League, and the second known as the Intrust Super Premiership NSW due sponsorship reasons. The competition acts as a second-tier league to the ten New South Wales-based National Rugby League clubs, as well the Canberra Raiders and New Zealand Warriors.

The winner of the Premiership will compete against the winner of the 2017 Queensland Cup in the 2017 NRL State Championship. Illawarra RLFC are the defending champions, following their 21–20 victory against the Mounties in the 2016 grand final.

A NSW Residents side, selected from the Premiership, lost 6–36 to the Queensland Residents on 7 May.

Current teams

In 2017, 12 clubs are fielding teams in the Intrust Super Premiership. The Blacktown Workers Sea Eagles replaced the Manly Sea Eagles. The Illawarra Cutters were renamed as the Illawarra RLFC.

A team from Fiji applied to enter the competition, gaining support from Petero Civoniceva and the Fijian government, but the NSWRL board determined that they were not ready for the 2017 season. The team would have played from the 15,000-capacity ANZ National Stadium in Suva.

Pat Weisner started the season as coach of the Blacktown Workers Sea Eagles, before being fired and replaced by Steven Hales. The Bulldogs named Ray Moujalli as their captain.

*: The season the team joined is in the NSW Cup, not any other competition before this.

Ladder

Finals

Grand Final

References

External links

New South Wales Cup
2017 in Australian rugby league
2017 in New Zealand rugby league